The following is a list of episodes for anime series based on the WIXOSS franchise. The first series, selector infected WIXOSS, was produced by J.C.Staff in collaboration with Takara Tomy. The series follows a girl named Ruko Kominato who, upon discovering a living 'LRIG' named Tama, is chosen as a Selector who must battle other Selectors in a card game known as WIXOSS, with victors allegedly able to have their wishes granted. The first season aired in Japan between April 3, 2014 and June 19, 2014 and was simulcast by Funimation in North America and Crunchyroll in other territories outside Japan. A second season, titled selector spread WIXOSS, aired in Japan between October 4, 2014 and December 19, 2014. A compilation film, selector destructed WIXOSS, was released on February 13, 2016.

A second series, titled Lostorage incited WIXOSS, aired in Japan between October 7, 2016 and December 23, 2016 and was simulcast by Crunchyroll. This series follows a girl named Suzuko Homura who, along with her LRIG Riru, finds herself in a new Selector battle in which her memories are placed on the line. The opening theme is "Lostorage" by Yuka Iguchi while the ending theme is "undeletable" by Cyua. The second part, Lostorage conflated WIXOSS, aired between April 6, 2018 and June 22, 2018. The opening theme is "Unlock" by Iguchi while the ending theme is "I" by Cyua.

A new television series titled WIXOSS Diva(A)Live, aired in Japan between from January 9, 2021 and March 27, 2021.

Episode list

selector series (2014)

Season 1: infected WIXOSS

Season 2: spread WIXOSS

Lostorage series (2016–18)

Season 1: incited WIXOSS

Season 2: conflated WIXOSS

DIVA series (2021)

WIXOSS DIVA(A)LIVE

Notes

References

WIXOSS